Teng Shih K'ou Congregational Church, often simply referred to as Teng Shih K'ou Church, was a Congregational church located at Teng Shih K'ou in Tung-ch'eng District, Peking. It was the largest Protestant church in Peking.

History 
Built in 1864, as part of Bridgman Girls' College founded by Eliza Jane Gillett Bridgman, the Teng Shih K'ou Church was the oldest of the American Board Mission churches in Peking. According to Sidney D. Gamble, it was "a beautiful example of Gothic architecture". The membership roll of the church included some three hundred families, notable for its well-trained pastor and a large number of well-to-do congregants.

The church was under the care of Henry Blodget (1825–1903), before being burnt down in 1900 during the Boxer Rebellion. In 1902, it was rebuilt by William Scott Ament. During the Republican era (1912–1949), the church was involved in numerous charitable activities. For instance, a speech in English given by Nellie Yu Roung Ling took place at the church in 1921, in aid of the "School for Poor Children" charity funds.

In 1958, in order to support the Great Leap Forward campaign, the sixty or so churches in Beijing (Peking) were forced to combine their worship services at four facilities, Teng Shih K'ou Church was one of them. During the Cultural Revolution (1966–1976), the church was demolished by Red Guards.

References 

Congregational churches
Destroyed churches
Churches in Beijing
Churches destroyed by arson
Rebuilt churches
Protestant churches in China
19th-century churches in China
20th-century churches in China
Gothic Revival church buildings in China